Richard Oldcorn (21 February 1938 – 1 June 2022) was a British international fencer. He competed at the 1964, 1968 and 1972 Summer Olympics.

Fencing career
Oldcorn represented England and won a gold medal in the team sabre, at the 1966 British Empire and Commonwealth Games in Kingston, Jamaica.

He was last selected to fence for Great Britain at the world championships in Buenos Aires in 1977, although injury prevented his taking part. Thereafter he became team manager, first of the national sabre team then for the entire British fencing team, managing them at the Moscow Olympics in 1980. Although he never won the national sabre championship (his best placing was second) from 1968 till the early 1970s he was the most successful British sabreur in international competition.

References

External links
 

1938 births
2022 deaths
British male fencers
Olympic fencers of Great Britain
Fencers at the 1964 Summer Olympics
Fencers at the 1968 Summer Olympics
Fencers at the 1972 Summer Olympics
Commonwealth Games medallists in fencing
Commonwealth Games gold medallists for England
Fencers at the 1966 British Empire and Commonwealth Games
People from South Bucks District
Medallists at the 1966 British Empire and Commonwealth Games